Arthur Fils (born 12 June 2004) is a French professional tennis player.

Fils has a career-high Association of Tennis Professionals (ATP) singles ranking of world No. 104, which he achieved on 27 February 2023. He also reached a career-high ATP doubles ranking of world No. 459 in July 2022.

Juniors
As a junior, Fils achieved his best results at the Grand Slam level at the 2021 French Open, where he won the boys' doubles title with Giovanni Mpetshi Perricard and placed runner-up in the boys' singles tournament, after which he was ranked as high as world No. 3 in July 2021.

Career

2022: ATP & Masters & top 250 debuts
Ranked No. 308 at the 2022 Rolex Paris Masters on his ATP debut, he became the youngest French qualifier to enter the main draw of a Masters 1000 tournament with a win against former top-10 player Fabio Fognini since Gael Monfils in 2004, the year of his birth. He lost to Fabio Fognini, who entered the draw as lucky loser. As a result he moved 50 positions up in the rankings.

2023: Maiden Challenger title, first two ATP career semifinals and wins & top 125
He won his maiden Challenger title at the 2023 Oeiras Indoors II and moved close to 60 positions up into the top 200 at No. 195 on 16 January 2023.

Ranked No. 163, he received a wildcard entry into the 2023 Open Sud de France and recorded his first match win on the ATP Tour by defeating former world no. 7 Richard Gasquet in straight sets. Next he defeated fourth seed Roberto Bautista Agut to reach the quarterfinals becoming the first player born in 2004 or later to reach this ATP level. Next he defeated another countryman, Quentin Halys, becoming the youngest Frenchman since Gasquet to reach an ATP semifinal in Metz in 2004. As a result he rose nearly 50 positions in the top 150 at world No. 117 on 13 February 2023. In the semifinals, Fils lost to second seed Jannik Sinner.

He reached back to back semifinals at the 2023 Open 13 Provence in Marseille defeating Roman Safiullin, second seed Jannik Sinner, after getting a walkover due to tournament withdrawal, and Stan Wawrinka in straight sets. As a result he moved another 15 positions up a few spots shy of the top 100. He lost to compatriot Benjamin Bonzi.

Junior Grand Slam finals

Singles: 1 (1 runner-up)

Doubles: 1 (1 title)

References

External links
 
 

2004 births
Living people
French male tennis players
Grand Slam (tennis) champions in boys' doubles
French Open junior champions